Miguel Alzamora (sometimes spelled Miquel; born 17 February 1974 in Artà) is a Spanish former track cyclist. He won the madison at the 1997 UCI Track Cycling World Championships with Joan Llaneras. He also competed at the 2000 and 2004 Summer Olympics.

Major results

1997
 1st  Madison, World Track Championships (with Joan Llaneras)
1999
 World Cup Classics
1st Madison, Cali (with Joan Llaneras)
1st Madison, Mexico City (with Joan Llaneras)
2nd Madison, Frisco (with Isaac Gálvez)
2000
 1st  Points race, National Track Championships
2002
 1st  Scratch, National Track Championships
 World Cup Classics
1st Madison, Monterrey (with Joan Llaneras)
2nd Scratch, Moscow
2003
 World Cup Classics
1st Scratch, Aguascalientes
2nd Madison, Aguascalientes
2004
 World Cup Classics
2nd Madison, Sydney
2006
 1st  Scratch, National Track Championships

References

External links 

1974 births
Living people
Spanish male cyclists
Cyclists at the 2000 Summer Olympics
Cyclists at the 2004 Summer Olympics
Olympic cyclists of Spain
UCI Track Cycling World Champions (men)
Spanish track cyclists
Cyclists from the Balearic Islands